Vared Mahalleh (also Romanized as Vāred Maḩalleh; also known as Vāred and Vāred Maḩalleh-ye Pā’īn Kūlā) is a village in Kolijan Rostaq-e Sofla Rural District, in the Central District of Sari County, Mazandaran Province, Iran. At the 2006 census, its population was 682, in 166 families.

References 

Populated places in Sari County